Bestbreeder from 1997 to 2000 is the 2003 compilation CD from Finnish melodic death metal band Children of Bodom. The live tracks off the album are available on Tokyo Warhearts.

This album was only released in Japan.

Track listing

References

2003 compilation albums
Children of Bodom albums